Griffith's Chapel, also known as Williamsville Methodist Church, is a historic Methodist chapel located at the junction of Williamsville Road and Abbotts Pond Road in Williamsville, Kent County, Delaware. It was built in 1850, and is a one-story, rectangular frame building measuring 24 feet wide by 30 feet deep.  It has a gable roof and is sheathed in clapboard.  The property also includes a 19th-century graveyard in which early members of the congregation are buried.

It was added to the National Register of Historic Places in 1983.

References

Methodist churches in Delaware
Churches completed in 1850
19th-century Methodist church buildings in the United States
Churches in Kent County, Delaware
Churches on the National Register of Historic Places in Delaware
National Register of Historic Places in Kent County, Delaware